This page's list covers the monocotyledon plants found in Great Britain and Ireland. This clade includes grasses, lilies, orchids, irises and a wide variety of aquatic plants.

Status key: * indicates an introduced species and e indicates an extinct species.

Order Alismatales (alismatids)

Family Butomaceae (flowering-rushes)

Family Alismataceae (water-plantains)

Family Hydrocharitaceae (tape-grasses)

Family Aponogetonaceae (Cape-pondweeds)

Family Scheuchzeriaceae (Rannoch-rush, pod grass)

Family Juncaginaceae (arrowgrasses)

Family Potamogetonaceae (pondweeds)

Family Ruppiaceae (widgeonweeds, ditch grasses, widgeon grass)

Family Zosteraceae (seagrasses)

Family Araceae (arum)

Order Acorales (sweet flag)

Family Acoraceae (sweet flag)

Order Commelinales

Family Commelinaceae (dayflowers, spiderworts)

Family Pontederiaceae (pickerel-weed family)

Order Poales

Family Eriocaulaceae (pipeworts)

Family Juncaceae (rushes)

Family Cyperaceae (sedges)

Family Poaceae (grasses)

Family Typhaceae (cattail family)

Family Bromeliaceae (bromeliads)

Order Asparagales (asparagoid lilies)

Family Asphodelaceae (asphodel family)

Family Asparagaceae (asparagus family)

Family Amaryllidaceae (amaryllis family)

Family Iridaceae (iris family)

Family Orchidaceae (orchid family)

Order Liliales

Family Colchicaceae (colchicum family)

Family Liliaceae (true lilies)

Family Melanthiaceae (bunchflower family)

Family Alstroemeriaceae (alstroemer family)

Order Dioscoreales

Family Dioscoreaceae (yam family)

See also

References

08
Vascular British Isles monocots